Gombak United Football Club was a professional football club which competed in the S.League, the top division of football in Singapore. The club was based in Bukit Gombak. During the early years of the S. League, Gombak United played their home games at Bukit Gombak Stadium before moving to Jurong West Stadium in 2006 until they dissolved in 2012.

History
Prior to joining the S.League, the club was known as Redhill Rangers FC.

From 1998 to 2002, the club played their S.League home games at the Bukit Gombak Stadium before pulling out of the S.League at the end of the 2002 season due to financial difficulties.

Gombak United rejoined the S.League in 2006 and moved their home games to Jurong West Stadium, but they pulled out of the S.League again during the 2013 season after seven seasons due to reduced takings. The club has indicated its intentions to rejoin the Singapore Premier League in 2019.

Seasons

 2003 saw the introduction of penalty shoot-outs if a match ended in a draw in regular time. Winners of penalty shoot-outs gained two points instead of one.
 Gombak United sat out the S.League from 2003 to 2005, and for a second spell from 2013.

Last updated on 25 February 2014

Managers

 David O'Connor (1999)
 Moey Yoke Ham (Jan 2000 – Aug 2001)
 Ivan Raznevich (Jan 2002 – Feb 2002)
 Jimmy Pearson (May 2002 – Aug 2002)
 Salim Moin (Jan 2006 – Dec 2007)
 Swandi Ahmad (Jan 2008 – July 8)
 A. Shasi Kumar (interim) (July 8 – Jan 2009)
 Darren Stewart (Jan 2009 – Dec 11)
 K Balagumaran (Jan 2012 – Dec 13)

Honours

Domestic
Cup
 Singapore League Cup: 1
 2008

Sponsors
 Main Sponsor: None
 Kit Supplier: ERKE

References

External links
 Official website
 S.League profile on Gombak United FC 

 
Football clubs in Singapore
Singapore Premier League clubs